Zafra taylorae is a species of sea snail in the family Columbellidae, the dove snails.

References

taylorae
Gastropods described in 2002